The Men's triple jump event took place on July 8, 2011 at the Kobe Universiade Memorial Stadium.

Medalists

Records

Results

Final

References

2011 Asian Athletics Championships
Triple jump at the Asian Athletics Championships